Un Monde Parfait was the debut album from the French singer Ilona (Mitrecey), and was released on August 10, 2005, by Sony BMG.

Part of the album was released in Germany on August 19, 2005 and in Switzerland, however it only had 6 of the tracks, and was entitled Ilona. Some fans who had purchased this mini version were angered as, if they wanted all the tracks, they had to purchase the new version.

Chart performance

This album was marketed in France on October, 2005. In French SNEP Albums Chart, it went straight to number 2 on October 15, which was its peak position, and remained on the chart until its 58th week, on February 2, 2007. Un Monde parfait was the 34th best selling album in 2005, with 178,454 copies sold, and the 130th in 2006, with 257,100 whole sales.

In Portuguese Albums Chart, it stayed for 25 weeks from 12/2006 to 38/2006 and reached #2 for three weeks.

Track listings

Worldwide : Un Monde parfait
 "Un Monde parfait" — 3:07
 "C'est les vacances" — 3:49
 "Dans ma fusée" — 3:53
 "Noël, que du bonheur" — 3:22
 "Retourner à l'école" — 3:17
 "Allô Allô" — 2:49
 "My Saxophone" — 3:03
 "MDR :-)" — 1:18
 "Sport d'hiver" — 3:05
 "Bye Bye Collège" — 3:11
 "C'est la fête" — 3:21
 "Arrivederci à bientôt" — 1:45
 "Un Monde parfait" (72 remix) — 3:41

Germany and Switzerland : Ilona
 "Un Monde parfait" — 3:47
 "C'est les vacances" — 3:50
 "Sport d'hiver" — 3:06
 "Allô, allô" — 2:49
 "Retourner à l'école"	— 3:16
 "My Saxophone" — 3:02
 "Un Monde parfait" (karaoke version) — 3:45
 "Un Monde parfait" (video)

Certifications and sales

Charts

1 Released under the title Ilona

External links
Official site

References

2005 albums
Ilona Mitrecey albums
European Border Breakers Award-winning albums